Dejerine–Sottas disease, also known as, Dejerine–Sottas neuropathy, Dejerine–Sottas syndrome, progressive hypertrophic interstitial polyneuropathy of childhood, demyelinating polyneuropathy of childhood, and onion bulb neuropathy (and, hereditary motor and sensory polyneuropathy type III and Charcot–Marie–Tooth disease type 3), is a hereditary neurological disorder characterised by damage to the peripheral nerves, demyelination, and resulting progressive muscle wasting and somatosensory loss. The condition is caused by mutations in a various genes and currently has no known cure.

The disorder is named for Joseph Jules Dejerine and Jules Sottas, French neurologists who first described it.

Signs and symptoms
Onset occurs in infancy or early childhood, usually before three years of age. Progression is slow until the teenage years at which point it may accelerate, resulting in severe disability.

Symptoms are more severe and more rapidly progressive than in the other more common Charcot–Marie–Tooth diseases. Some patients may never walk and will be reliant on wheelchair use by the end of their first decade, while others may need only a cane (walking stick), crutches, or similar support through most of their life, but this is rare.

Dejerine–Sottas disease is characterized by moderate to severe lower and upper extremity weakness and loss of sensation, which occur mainly in the lower legs, forearms, feet and hands.  Loss of muscle mass and reduced muscle tone usually occur as the disease progresses. Other symptoms may include pain in the extremities, curvature of the spine, clawed hands, foot deformities, ataxia, peripheral areflexia, and slow acquisition of motor skills in childhood. Symptoms that are less common can include limitation of eye movements, other eye problems such as nystagmus or anisocoria, or moderate to severe hearing loss.

Causes
Dejerine–Sottas neuropathy is caused by a genetic defect either in the proteins found in axons or the proteins found in myelin. Specifically, it has been associated with mutations in MPZ, PMP22, PRX, and EGR2 genes. The disorder is inherited in an autosomal dominant or autosomal recessive manner.

Diagnosis
On medical imaging, the nerves of the extremities (and cranial nerves in some cases) appear enlarged due to hypertrophy of the connective interstitial tissue, giving the nerves a distinct "onion-bulb" appearance. Peripheral (and possibly cranial) nerve excitability and conduction speed are reduced.

Treatment
Management is symptomatic for this condition .

See also
 Charcot–Marie–Tooth disease

References

External links 

Neurological disorders
Neurogenetic disorders
Rare diseases